The 2015 Oregon State Beavers football team represented Oregon State University during the 2015 NCAA Division I FBS football season. The team was led by first-year head coach Gary Andersen and played their home games at Reser Stadium in Corvallis. Oregon State was a member of the North Division of the Pac-12 Conference.

Offseason

Coaching change
For the first time since the 2003 offseason, Oregon State underwent a coaching change.

Riley exits
In a move that shook the college football world, the University of Nebraska announced the hiring of Oregon State's head coach Mike Riley on December 4, 2014. Riley had what was dubbed a "lifetime contract" at Oregon State, where every year he led a team to a bowl game, his contract was extended by one year. In 2010, Oregon State Athletic Director Bob De Carolis said Riley had talked about wanting to retire in Corvallis and be the "Joe Paterno of Oregon State." In the same time period, Riley said, "I want to make it known that I'm very excited to be to coaching at Oregon State University and I anticipate doing so for a long time." Nebraska fired head coach Bo Pelini, opening the door for Riley to make the unanticipated move.

Welcoming Andersen
An equally shocking move came just six days later, as the Oregon State Athletic Department announced that they had hired Gary Andersen of Wisconsin as Riley's replacement on December 10, 2014. Andersen left Wisconsin after just two years with the program, citing high academic standards set by the university made recruiting difficult for Andersen, compiling a 19–7 overall record and coming off of a trip to the Big Ten Football Championship Game. Since Andersen left after just two seasons, a reported $3 million buyout was in effect. The coaching announcement came moments after the university announced $42 million upgrades to its football operations building, known as the Valley Football Center. It marked the second straight Wisconsin coach (Bret Bielema left for Arkansas) to leave for what many considered a job with a less prestigious program. Andersen was announced in a press conference on December 12, 2014.

Schedule

Source:

Game summaries

Weber State

Michigan

San Jose State

Stanford

Arizona

Washington State

Colorado

Utah

UCLA

Referee for the game is Michael Batlan.

California

Washington

Oregon

References

Oregon State
Oregon State Beavers football seasons
Oregon State Beavers football